In the Commonwealth of Massachusetts (a U.S. state), there are three recognized political parties and an additional 29 political designations in which registered voters may choose to enroll. Voters may also choose to remain as "unenrolled voters" (i.e., independents). Political parties hold primary elections, while political designations do not. A political designation is a one-to-three word descriptive term which may appear next to candidates' names on election ballots.

Background
To be recognized as a political designation in Massachusetts, fifty registered voters must file a document with the state seeking this status. To be recognized as a political party, a designation must either have obtained at least 3% of the vote for any state-wide office at the preceding biennial state election, or have enrolled at least 1% of all registered voters.

Election ballots include the candidates' names followed by either the candidates' party or their designation. In many cases, non-party designations still include the word "party" in their name. In 2023, however, only three such designations are recognized as parties: the Republican Party, the Democratic Party, and the Libertarian Party.

Enrolled and unenrolled voters
In Massachusetts, registered voters may choose to (1) enroll in a political party; (2) enroll with a political designation; or (3) choose to be an unenrolled voter (i.e., an independent).

Voters may change their enrollment status with their election official, with a deadline twenty days before an election.

All registered voters may vote in general elections. Massachusetts voters enrolled in a particular party may vote only in that party's primary, and cannot cross-over to vote in another party's primary, but "unenrolled" voters may cast a primary ballot for one of the four parties. Political designations are treated as "unenrolled" voters for primary purposes, and so they too may choose to vote in one of the party primaries.

Under Massachusetts law, a political designation is created when fifty registered Massachusetts voters "file a form with the Secretary of the Commonwealth requesting that they, or any other voters, may change their registration to such designation." These non-party political designations may field candidates for statewide office, if they petition with a sufficient number of signatures (10,000).

The various political designations have generally small membership, although they have attracted some media attention.

List of current parties and designations
, the Secretary of the Commonwealth listed three officially recognized political parties and 30 officially recognized political designations in Massachusetts.

See also
List of elections in Massachusetts
Political party strength in Massachusetts

Notes

References

Election law
Massachusetts elections
Politics of Massachusetts